Cédric Kinzumbi Tsimba (born 5 August 1984 in Kinshasa, Zaire) is a retired Swiss footballer.

Career
Tsimba began his career with Servette FC in the Swiss Super League. He later joined FC Baulmes before moving to Sturm Graz in Austria.  A loan spell and permanent transfer with FC Wil would follow, before moving to FC Meyrin where he would play until retirement.

References

External links
 Cedric Tsimba - Fussballdaten - Die Fußball-Datenbank

1984 births
Living people
Democratic Republic of the Congo footballers
FC Wil players
Association football forwards
Naturalised citizens of Switzerland
Democratic Republic of the Congo emigrants to Switzerland
SK Sturm Graz players
Servette FC players
Swiss men's footballers
Swiss people of Democratic Republic of the Congo descent
Swiss Super League players
Footballers from Kinshasa